The World Professional Basketball Tournament was an annual invitational tournament held in Chicago from 1939 to 1948 and sponsored by the Chicago Herald American. Many teams came from the National Basketball League, but it also included the best teams from other leagues and the best independent barnstorming teams such as the New York Rens and Harlem Globetrotters. Games were played at various sites including Chicago Coliseum, International Amphitheater and Chicago Stadium.

The NBL champion usually won this tournament, with three exceptions: the New York Rens won the first WPBT in 1939, while the Harlem Globetrotters—a strongly competitive squad in those days—won the following year. In 1943, the Washington Bears (with many New York Rens players on their roster) won the tournament. The NBL's Fort Wayne Zollner Pistons won the most titles (three, from 1944–46), while the NBL's Oshkosh All-Stars made the most finals appearances with five, winning only once (in 1942). 

The last tournament was held in 1948, with the Minneapolis Lakers defeating the New York Rens 75–71 in the tournament final. The following year, The Indianapolis News attempted to hold a similar tournament, inviting the Wilkes-Barre Barons from the American Basketball League, three teams each from the Basketball Association of America and the National Basketball League, and one team that would remain unidentified until shortly before the seeded draw. Although the National Basketball League agreed to attend, the tournament did not come to fruition after the BAA declined the invitation.


Tournament finals results
1939 - New York Rens 34–25 Oshkosh All-Stars 
1940 - Harlem Globetrotters 31–29 Chicago Bruins
1941 - Detroit Eagles 39–37 Oshkosh All-Stars  
1942 - Oshkosh All-Stars 43–41 Detroit Eagles  
1943 - Washington Bears 43–31 Oshkosh All-Stars  
1944 - Fort Wayne Zollner Pistons 50–33 Brooklyn Eagles  
1945 - Fort Wayne Zollner Pistons 78–52 Dayton Acmes 
1946 - Fort Wayne Zollner Pistons 73–57 Oshkosh All-Stars  
1947 - Indianapolis Kautskys 62–47 Toledo Jeeps 
1948 - Minneapolis Lakers 75–71 New York Rens

Tournament MVPs
1939 - Puggy Bell, New York Rens 
1940 - Sonny Boswell, Harlem Globetrotters 
1941 - Buddy Jeannette, Detroit Eagles 
1942 - Ed Riska, Oshkosh All-Stars 
1943 - Curly Armstrong, Fort Wayne Zollner Pistons 
1944 - Bobby McDermott, Fort Wayne Zollner Pistons 
1945 - Buddy Jeannette, Fort Wayne Zollner Pistons 
1946 - George Mikan, Chicago American Gears 
1947 - Jule Rivlin, Toledo Jeeps 
1948 - George Mikan, Minneapolis Lakers

All-time championship game scoring records

All-time World Tournament team records

 Twenty-seven teams entered the tournament in various years but did not win a game; eight teams had one win.
 The New York Celtics played in the initial tournament in 1939, but lost their only game. Another well-known team, the Philadelphia Sphas, had a win and a loss in their only appearance, in 1941 .

Recap by year

1939 

 1st Place: New York Rens 34- Oshkosh All-Stars 25
 MVP- Puggy Bell (New York Rens)
 Leading Championship Game Scorers:
 Pop Gates (New York Rens) 12
 Leroy Edwards (Oshkosh All-Stars) 12
 3rd Place: Harlem Globetrotters 36- Sheboygan Redskins 33
 5th Place: New York Yankees, Chicago Harmons, New York Celtics
 8th Place: Fort Wayne Harvesters, Brenton Harbor House of David, Illinois Grads, Clarksburg Oilers

1940 

 1st Place: Harlem Globetrotters 31- Chicago Bruins 29
 MVP- Sonny Boswell (Harlem Globetrotters)
 Leading Championship Game Scorers:
 Sonny Boswell (Harlem Globetrotters) 12
 Mike Novak (Chicago Bruins) 7
 3rd Place: Washington Heurich Brewers 41- Syracuse Reds 30
 5th Place: Sheboygan Redskins, Waterloo Wonders, Oshkosh All-Stars, New York Rens
 9th Place: Fort Wayne Harvesters, Rochester Seagrams, Kenosha Royals, Canton Bulldogs, Benton Harbor House of David, Clarksburg Oilers

1941 

 1st Place: Detroit Eagles 39- Oshkosh All-Stars 37
 MVP- Buddy Jeannette (Detroit Eagles)
 Leading Championship Game Scorers:
 Ed Sadowski (Detroit Eagles) 11
 Bob Carpenter (Oshkosh All-Stars) 8
 3rd Place: New York Rens 57- Toledo White Huts 42
 5th Place: Chicago Bruins, Kenosha Royals, Harlem Globetrotters, Philadelphia Sphas
 9th Place: Davenport Central Turner Rockets, Indianapolis Kautskys, Newark Elks, Fort Wayne Zollner Pistons, Dayton Sucher Wonders, Rochester Seagrams, Sheboygan Redskins, Bismark Phantoms

1942 

 1st Place: Oshkosh All-Stars 43- Detroit Eagles 41
 MVP- Ed Riska (Oshkosh All-Stars)
 Leading Championship Game Scorers:
 Gene Englund (Oshkosh All-Stars) 17
 Buddy Jeanette (Detroit Eagles ) 14
 3rd Place: Long Island Grumman Flyers 43- Harlem Globetrotters 41
 5th Place: Aberdeen Army Ordinance Training Center, Sheboygan Redskins, Chicago Bruins, New York Rens
 9th Place: Detroit A.A.A., Columbus Bobb Chevrolets, Northern Indiana Steelers, Davenport Central Turner Rockets, Toledo White Huts, Hagerstown Conoco Oilers, Indianapolis Kautskys, Fort Wayne Zollner Pistons

1943 

 1st Place: Washington, D.C. Bears 43- Oshkosh All-Stars 31
 MVP- Curly Armstrong (Fort Wayne Zollner Pistons)
 Leading Championship Game Scorers:
 Johnny Isaacs (Washington, D.C. Bears) 11
 Leroy Edwards (Oshkosh All-Stars) 7
 3rd Place: Fort Wayne Zollner Pistons 58- Dayton Dive Bombers 52
 5th Place: Detroit Eagles, Sheboygan Redskins, Harlem Globetrotters, Minneapolis Sparklers
 9th Place: Akron Collegians, Indianapolis Pure Oils, Chicago Ramblers, South Bend Studebaker Champions

1944 

 1st Place: Fort Wayne Zollner Pistons 50- Brooklyn Eagles 33
 MVP- Bobby McDermott (Fort Wayne Zollner Pistons)
 Leading Championship Game Scorers:
 Jake Pellington (Fort Wayne Zollner Pistons) 19
 Bob Tough & Bernie Opper (Brooklyn Eagles) 11
 3rd Place: Harlem Globetrotters 37- New York Rens 29
 5th Place: Dayton Aviators, Cleveland Chase Brassmen, Sheboygan Redskins, Oshkosh All-Stars
 9th Place: Akron Collegians, Camp Campbell Tankmen, Detroit Suffrins, Indianapolis Pure Oils, Rochester Wings, Pittsburgh Corbetts

1945 

 1st Place: Fort Wayne Zollner Pistons 78- Dayton Acmes 52
 MVP- Buddy Jeanette (Fort Wayne Zollner Pistons)
 Leading Championship Game Scorers:
 Buddy Jeanette (Fort Wayne Zollner Pistons) 18
 John Mahnken (Dayton Acmes) 16
 3rd Place: Chicago American Gears 64- New York Rens 55
 5th Place: Oshkosh All-Stars, Pittsburgh Raiders, Midland Dow Chemicals, Harlem Globetrotters
 9th Place: Hartford Nutmegs, Detroit Mansfields, Indianapolis Oilers, Cleveland Allmen Transfers, Newark C-O Twos, Long Island Grumman Hellcats

1946 

 1st Place: Fort Wayne Zollner Pistons 73- Oshkosh All-Stars 57
 Fort Wayne Zollner Pistons 56- Oshkosh All-Stars 47
 Oshkosh All-Stars 61- Ft. Wayne Zollner Pistons 59
 (Fort Wayne Zollner Pistons wins series 2 games to 1)
 MVP- George Mikan (Chicago American Gears)
 All-First team: Bobby McDermott, Bob Feerick, Jerry Bush, Leroy Edwards, George Mikan
 All-Second team: Paul Cloyd, Bob Calihan, Mike Bloom, Stanley Stutz, Bob Carpenter
 Leading Championship Game Scorers:
 Bobby McDermott (Fort Wayne Zollner Pistons) 20
 Leroy Edwards (Oshkosh All-Stars) 24
 3rd Place: Chicago American Gears 65- Baltimore Bullets 50
 Chicago American Gears 59- Baltimore Bullets 54
 (Chicago American Gears wins series 2 games to none)
 5th Place: New York Rens, Sheboygan Redskins, Midland Dows, Anderson Chiefs
 9th Place: Pittsburgh Raiders, Cleveland Allmen Transfers, Indianapolis Kautskys, Detroit Mansfields, Toledo Whites, Dayton Mickeys

1947 

 1st Place: Indianapolis Kautskys 62- Toledo Jeeps 47
 MVP- Jule Rivlin (Toledo Jeeps)
 Leading Championship Game Scorers:
 Leo Klier (Indianapolis Kautskys) 12
 George Sobek (Toledo Jeeps) 20
 3rd Place: Fort Wayne Zollner Pistons 86- Oshkosh All-Stars 67
 5th Place: Sheboygan Redskins, Tri-Cities Blackhawks, Anderson Duffey Packers, Midland Dows
 9th Place: Herkimer Mohawk Redskins, Pittsburgh Pirates, Syracuse Nationals, Portland Indians, New York Rens, Baltimore Bullets

1948 

 1st Place: Minneapolis Lakers 75- New York Rens 71
 MVP- George Mikan (Minneapolis Lakers)
 Leading Championship Game Scorers:
 George Mikan (Minneapolis Lakers) 40
 Sweetwater Clifton (New York Rens) 24
 3rd Place: Anderson Duffey Packers 66- Tri-Cities Blackhawks 44
 5th Place: Bridgeport Newfield Steelers, Fort Wayne Zollner Pistons, Indianapolis Kautskys, Wilkes-Barre Barons

References

External links
 
 
 
 

World Professional Basketball Tournament
Recurring sporting events established in 1939
1948 disestablishments in the United States
Basketball competitions in the United States
National Basketball League (United States)